Willoughby Powell was an architect in Queensland, Australia. Some of his works are now heritage-listed.

Early life 
Willoughby Powell was born in England.

Architectural career
Powell trained as an architect in Cheltenham, England. In 1872 he emigrated to Australia with his brother and worked for Richard Gailey in Brisbane before joining the Queensland Works Department in 1874. After winning a design competition for the Toowoomba Grammar School he set up a practice there between 1875 and 1877. After travelling to England in 1878 he worked again for Gailey before moving to Maryborough to supervise his own work between 1882 and 1885. He then returned to Gailey in Brisbane until 1893 when the financial crash saw the bottom drop out of the building trade. His own design work seems to have largely been for churches, public buildings and large houses.

Significant works 
Buildings designed by Powell include:
 1875: Toowoomba Grammar School
 1876: Gabbinbar Homestead
 1877: Wesley Uniting Church, Toowoomba
 1883: Baddow House
 1883: Mortuary Chapel, Maryborough Cemetery
 1887: Atkinson & Powell Building is his only work in North Queensland, one of very few shops known to have been designed by him.
 1887: Warwick Town Hall
 1900: Toowoomba City Hall

References

Attribution 

Articles incorporating text from the Queensland Heritage Register
19th-century Australian architects
20th-century Australian architects
Australian ecclesiastical architects